Verschoor is a Dutch toponymic surname. It is a contraction of van der Schoor, more or less meaning "from the shore". Notable people with the surname include:

Annie Romein-Verschoor (1895–1978), Dutch writer and historian
Bart Verschoor (born 1965), Dutch competitive sailor
George Verschoor (born 1960), American television producer
Hermanus Eliza Verschoor (1791–1877), Dutch politician
Maria Verschoor (born 1994), Dutch field hockey player
Martijn Verschoor (born 1985), Dutch road racing cyclist
Matthijs Verschoor (born 1955), Dutch classical pianist
Monica Verschoor (born 1950), Dutch pop singer and pianist
Richard Verschoor (born 2000), Dutch racing driver
Sandy Verschoor (born 1959), Australian politician
Thayer Verschoor (born 1961), American (Arizona) politician
Verschoore
Omer Verschoore (1888–1931), Belgian road racing cyclist
Patrick J. Verschoore (born 1943), American (Illinois) politician

See also
Van Schoor, related surname

References

Dutch-language surnames
Toponymic surnames